Chryseobacterium marinum  is a bacterium from the genus of Chryseobacterium.

References

Further reading

External links
Type strain of Chryseobacterium marinum at BacDive -  the Bacterial Diversity Metadatabase

marinum
Bacteria described in 2009